Ballard was a small village located between Chenoa and Lexington, IL on the Union Pacific railroad.

History 
At one point in time, Ballard had a decent population with a few businesses and homes. The last remaining marker of the settlement was The Graham and Bennion Elevator, better known to locals simply as "The Ballard elevator". The roughly 80 foot structure was demolished in 2006.

References

Villages in Illinois